Andrey Verveykin (born 3 January 1966) is a Kazakhstani ski jumper. He competed at the 1992 Winter Olympics and the 1994 Winter Olympics.

References

1966 births
Living people
Kazakhstani male ski jumpers
Olympic ski jumpers of the Unified Team
Olympic ski jumpers of Kazakhstan
Ski jumpers at the 1992 Winter Olympics
Ski jumpers at the 1994 Winter Olympics
Place of birth missing (living people)